The Brochocki BKB-1 was a Canadian mid-wing, single-seat, experimental tailless glider that was designed and constructed by Stefan Brochocki with assistance from Witold Kasper and A. Bodek. The designation indicated the contributions of all three men. The aircraft was intended to study flight above the stall angle.

Design and development
The BKB-1 was constructed in 1959 and built entirely from wood. The  wing was swept, had a 9.5:1 aspect ratio and employed a NACA 8-H-12 airfoil.

The prototype BKB-1 was originally registered in Canada as CF-ZDK-X. Later it was moved to the United States, owned by Kasper and registered as N2991G.

As a testbed the aircraft went through several modification states. The modifications included aerodynamic devices to improve aircraft control above the stalling angle. This allowed stalled landings with no ground roll. As a result of these and other design changes the aircraft was designated as the BKB-1A, the "A" indicating aerobatics. The aircraft was intended to be fully aerobatic, including tumbling maneuvers.

Kasper had a plan to produce the aircraft and the developmental derivative Kasper Bekas, which mount different wings to a common fuselage, as a single kit, with the choice of wings, but it seems none was actually produced.

Operational history
The sole BKB-1A was destroyed on 6 November 1971 near Arlington, Washington, when a pilot conducted unauthorized aerobatics in the aircraft, subjecting it to an estimated negative 30g during a high-speed inverted descent. The 31-year-old commercial pilot, who had a total of 3000 flying hours and five hours on type, was wearing a parachute, but did not bail out and was killed in the accident. The National Transportation Safety Board cited as cause factors that the pilot misjudged the aircraft's speed and overstressed the airframe to failure.

Variants
BKB-1
Early configuration of the aircraft
BKB-1A
Later configuration of the same aircraft with modifications for parachute flight above the stalling angle and also aerobatics.

Specifications (BKB-1)

See also

Notes

References

1950s Canadian sailplanes
Homebuilt aircraft
Tailless aircraft
Aircraft first flown in 1959
Mid-wing aircraft